Limnonectes shompenorum (common name: Shompen frog) is a species of frog in the family Dicroglossidae. It is found in Great Nicobar Island  (India), its type locality, and in western Sumatra (Indonesia). It is similar to Limnonectes macrodon. The name refers to Shompen people, the indigenous people of the interior of Great Nicobar Island.

Description
Limnonectes shompenorum is a relatively large, robust frog. Adult females measure  in snout–vent length. A male measured  in snout–vent length.

Limnonectes shompenorum can be distinguished from its closest relatives by the following suite of characters:"(1) head narrower than body, and longer than broad; (2) interorbital distance greater than the upper eyelid width; (3) fingers with movable dermal fringe; (4) tips of fingers weakly swollen; (5) finger 4 longer than finger 2; (6) toes completely webbed; (7) dark horizontal loreal stripe; and (8) partially pigmented eggs."

Diet
Limnonectes shompenorum feed on relatively large prey; the stomachs in the type series contained beetles, a cockroach, and a small, unidentified frog.

Habitat and conservation
Limnonectes shompenorum are found in leaf-litter along rivers in tropical forest and forest edges, but also some distance away from rivers. Limnonectes shompenorum is a common species not considered threatened by the International Union for Conservation of Nature (IUCN), although these frogs are to some extent suffering from habitat loss and pollution from agriculture. They are also harvested for food.

References

Shompenorum
Amphibians described in 1996
Amphibians of Indonesia
Frogs of India
Fauna of the Andaman and Nicobar Islands
Fauna of Sumatra
Taxonomy articles created by Polbot